Eyo Eyekip is an Oron Village in Urue-Offong/Oruko local government area of Akwa Ibom state in Nigeria. Formed by the children of Okip from the Ubodung clan of Oron Nation.

References 

Places in Oron Nation
Villages in Akwa Ibom